The Fall of Babylon denotes the end of the Neo-Babylonian Empire after it was conquered by the Achaemenid Empire in 539 BCE.

Nabonidus (Nabû-na'id, 556–539 BCE), son of the Assyrian priestess Adda-Guppi, came to the throne in 556 BCE, after overthrowing the young king Labashi-Marduk. For long periods he entrusted rule to his son, prince and coregent Belshazzar, who was a capable soldier, but a poor politician. As a result, he was somewhat unpopular with many of his subjects, particularly the priesthood and the military class. To the east, the Achaemenid Empire had been growing in strength. In October 539 BCE, after the Battle of Opis, Cyrus the Great entered Babylon, and Babylonia was incorporated into the Persian Achaemenid realm as a satrapy. As recorded in the Cyrus Cylinder, Cyrus vowed to respect the people of Babylon and allowed incarcerated peoples to return to their homeland; consequently, he was viewed as the legitimate successor of the ancient Babylonian kings, and became popular in Babylon itself in contrast to Nabonidus.

Conditions

A number of factors arose which would ultimately lead to the fall of Babylon. The population of Babylonia became restive and increasingly disaffected under Nabonidus. The Marduk priesthood hated Nabonidus because of his suppression of Marduk's cult and his elevation of the cult of the moon-god Sin. He excited a strong feeling against himself by attempting to centralize the religion of Babylonia in the temple of Marduk at Babylon, and thus alienated the local priesthoods.

The military party also despised him on account of his antiquarian tastes. He seemed to have left the defense of his kingdom to Belshazzar (a capable soldier but poor diplomat who alienated the political elite), while occupying himself with the more congenial work, like excavating foundation records of the temples and determining the dates of their builders. He also spent time outside Babylonia, rebuilding temples in the Assyrian city of Harran, and also among his Arab subjects in the deserts to the south of Mesopotamia.

Nabonidus and Belshazzar's Assyrian heritage is also likely to have added to this resentment. In addition, Mesopotamian military might had usually been concentrated in the martial state of Assyria. Babylonia had always been more vulnerable to conquest and invasion than its northern neighbour, and without the might of Assyria to keep foreign powers in check, Babylonia was ultimately exposed.

Preparations

It was in the sixth year of Nabonidus (550/549 BC) that Cyrus the Great, the Achaemenid Persian king of Anshan in Elam, revolted against his suzerain Astyages, king of the Manda or Medes, at Ecbatana. Astyages' army betrayed him to his enemy, and Cyrus established himself at Ecbatana, thus putting an end to the massive Median Empire and making the Persian faction dominant among the Iranic peoples.

Three years later Cyrus had become king of all Persia, and was engaged in a campaign to put down a revolt among the Assyrians in 547 BCE. Meanwhile, Nabonidus had established a camp in the desert of his colony of Arabia, near the southern frontier of his kingdom, leaving his son Belshazzar (Belsharutsur) in command of the army. In 540 BCE, according to Dougherty and S.Smith, Cyrus invaded Syria, most of Babylon's eastern possessions. In a few months, many of Nabonidus’s vassals were under Persian authority. Nabonidus has returned to Babylon in 543 BCE due to Cyrus raiding the border constantly.

Invasion
In 539 BCE, Cyrus invaded Babylonia. Historical reconstruction of the fall of Babylon to Persia has been problematic, due to the inconsistencies between the various source documents. Both the Babylonian Chronicles and the Cyrus Cylinder describe Babylon being taken "without battle", whereas the Greek historians Herodotus and Xenophon report that the city was besieged. The biblical Book of Daniel notes that the king was killed.

According to Xenophon, Belshazzar was killed in this conflict, but his account is not widely accepted. Nabonidus surrendered and was deported. Gutian guards were placed at the gates of the great temple of Bel, where the services continued without interruption. Cyrus did not arrive until 28/29 October, with Gobryas having acted for him in his absence. Gobryas was then made governor of the province of Babylon.

Babylon, like Assyria, became a colony of Achaemenid Persia in 539 BCE.

Absorption

The Neo-Babylonian Empire had pursued a policy of population transfer but one of the first acts of Cyrus was to allow these exiles to return to their own homes, carrying with them the images of their gods and their sacred vessels. Permission to do so was embodied in a proclamation, whereby the conqueror endeavored to justify his claim to the Babylonian throne. According to the biblical account, Cyrus sent the Jewish exiles back to Israel from the Babylonian captivity. Although the Jews never rebelled against the Persian occupation, they were restive under the period of Darius I consolidating his rule, and under Artaxerxes I,  without taking up arms, or reprisals being exacted from the Persian government.

Among Babylonians, feelings were still strong that none had a right to rule over western Asia until he had been consecrated to the office by Bel and his priests; and accordingly, Cyrus henceforth assumed the imperial title of "King of Babylon". Cyrus claimed to be the legitimate successor of the ancient Babylonian kings and the avenger of Bel-Marduk and portrayed himself as the savior, chosen by Marduk to restore order and justice.  Cyrus was assumed by the Marduk priesthood to be wrathful at the impiety of Nabonidus who had moved the images of the local gods from their ancestral shrines to his formal capital Babylon. A year before Cyrus' death, in 529 BCE, he elevated his son Cambyses II in the government, making him king of Babylon, while he reserved for himself the fuller title of "king of the (other) provinces" of the empire.

It was only when Darius I acquired the Persian throne and ruled it as a representative of the Zoroastrian religion that the old tradition was broken and the claim of Babylon to confer legitimacy on the rulers of western Asia ceased to be acknowledged. Immediately after Darius seized Persia, Babylonia briefly recovered its independence under a native ruler, Nidinta-Bel, who took the name of Nebuchadnezzar III. He purportedly reigned from October to December 521 BCE, when the Persians took it by storm, while during this period, Assyria to the north also rebelled. A year later, in 521 BCE, Babylon again revolted and declared independence under the Armenian King Arakha, who took the name Nebuchadnezzar IV; on this occasion, after its capture by the Persians, the walls were partly destroyed. Esagila, the great temple of Bel, however, still continued to be maintained and was a center of Babylonian patriotism.

Partition of Babylon

The Macedonian king Alexander the Great conquered Babylon in 331 BC, and died there in 323 BCE. After a decade of wars between Alexander's former generals, Babylonia and Assyria were absorbed into the Macedonian Seleucid Empire.

It has long been maintained that the foundation of Seleucia diverted the population to the new capital of Babylonia, and that the ruins of the old city became a quarry for the builders of the new seat of government, but the recent publication of the Babylonian Chronicles of the Hellenistic Period has shown that urban life was still very much the same well into the Parthian age (150 BCE to 226 CE). The Parthian king Mithridates conquered the region into the Arsacid Empire in 150 BC, and the region became something of a battleground between Greeks and Parthians.

Historiography
The cuneiform texts – the Chronicle of Nabonidus, the Cyrus Cylinder and the so-called Verse Account of Nabonidus – were written after the Persian victory. They portray Nabonidus negatively and present Cyrus as the liberator of Babylon, the defender of the Babylonian gods and consequently as the legitimate successor to the Babylonian throne. Modern scholarship recognizes the Cyrus Cylinder as a propaganda tablet designed to manipulate the public against Nabonidus and to legitimize Cyrus' conquest of Babylon. Regarding its claim that Babylon fell to the Persians without opposition, Briant writes, "It appears prima facie unlikely that Babylon could have fallen without resistance", and Piotr Michalowski notes, "there is no contemporary evidence to support this suspicious claim." Similarly, the Nabonidus Chronicle is a rework of history from the Persian court purporting to be a text from Nabonidus. Its first part relates events that can be verified from other sources; however, the latter part, particularity when dealing with the seventeenth year of Nabonidus, is especially flattering of Cyrus, with the people of Babylon welcoming him by spreading green twigs before him.

Gauthier Tolini has proposed a plausible reconstruction of how Babylon fell. A receipt for reconstruction work on the Enlil Gate demonstrates that there was a forced entry into Babylon. Tolini proposes that a portion of the Persian army, under the command of General Ugbaru, penetrated the Enlil Gate on the West side of the Euphrates, then crossed the river to take the eastern districts of Babylon. This may be the source of the story by Herodotus that the Persian army, having diverted the Euphrates, entered Babylon along the riverbed. This surprise capture of Babylon is consistent with the story recorded in Daniel 5.

The timing of the attack may have contributed to the success of Ugbaru's strategy. Herodotus, Xenophon and Daniel 5 all record that Babylon was in the midst of a festival on the night it was taken. The Babylonian Chronicle records that Babylon was captured on 16th Tašrîtu, which was the night before the akitu festival in honor of Sin, the moon god.

The Cyropaedia, a partly fictional biography of Cyrus the Great which may contain a historical core, contains content as described by Xenophon who had been in Persia as one of the Ten Thousand Greek soldiers who fought on the losing side in a Persian civil war, events which he recounted in his Anabasis. It is also possible that stories about Cyrus were told (and embellished) by Persian court society and that these are the basis of Xenophon's text. Herodotus, although writing long after the events, had traveled in Mesopotamia and spoken to Babylonians. In Cyropaedia (7.5.20–33), Xenophon, in agreement with Herodotus (I.292), says that the Achaemenid army entered the city via the channel of the Euphrates river, the river having been diverted into trenches that Cyrus had dug for the invasion, and that the city was unprepared because of a great festival that was being observed.

Cyropaedia (7.5.26–35) describes the capture of Babylon by Gobryas, who led a detachment of men to the capital and killed the king of Babylon. In 7.5.25, Gobryas remarks that "this night the whole city is given over to revelry", including to some extent the guards. Those who opposed the forces under Gobryas were struck down, including those outside the banquet hall. The capture of the city, and the slaying of the son king of the king (4.6.3), is described in Cyropaedia (7:5.26–30) as follows:

Both Xenophon and Daniel 5 describe the demise of Belshazzar on the night that the city was taken. Xenophon, Herodotus, and Daniel agree that the city was taken by surprise, at the time of a festival, and with some (but apparently not much) loss of life. The Cyropaedia (4.6.3) states that a father and son were both reigning over Babylon when the city fell, and that the younger ruler was killed.

A new system of government was put in place and the Persian multi-national state was developed. This system of government reached its peak after the conquest of Egypt by Cambyses II during his reign, thereafter receiving its ideological foundation in the inscription of the Persian kings.

Hebrew Bible

Book of Isaiah

The conquest of Jerusalem by the Neo-Babylonian Empire and the exile of its elite in 586 BCE ushered in the next stage in the formation of the Book of Isaiah. Deutero-Isaiah addresses himself to the Israelites in exile, offering them the hope of return. Deutero-Isaiah's predictions of the imminent fall of Babylon and his glorification of Cyrus as the deliverer of Israel date his prophecies to 550–539 BCE, and probably towards the end of this period.

Book of Daniel

The Book of Daniel (2nd century BCE), chapter 5 relates the final night of Belshazzar, just before the Persian invasion. In the story, Belshazzar holds a feast, during which Belshazzar intends his guests to drink from the temple treasures from Jerusalem while praising Babylonian gods. He then sees a hand writing on the palace wall. Daniel is called to interpret the writing after Belshazzar's wise men are unable. Belshazzar is killed and Darius the Mede, a figure not known to history, becomes king.

See also

 Whore of Babylon
 Fall of Nineveh

Footnotes

References
 
 
 
 
 
 
 

539 BC
Babylon
Book of Daniel
Book of Isaiah
Cyrus the Great
Jewish Babylonian history
Military history of the Achaemenid Empire
Neo-Babylonian Empire